Bernie Fraser may refer to:

Bernie Fraser (economist) (born 1941), Australian economist
Bernie Fraser (rugby union) (born 1953), New Zealand rugby union player